Fight for Love is a Hong Kong martial arts and romantic comedy television series co-produced by Television Broadcasts Limited (TVB) and China International Television Corporation (CITVC) and starring Bowie Lam, Sonija Kwok, and Gong Beibi. It was filmed from August 2001 to early 2002 and was aired overseas form 27 May to 21 June 2002. Then, it premiered in Hong Kong on TVB Pay Vision's TVB Drama channel on 2 February 2004 and ended on 27 February 2004. The drama premiered on TVB Jade on 2 January 2013 and ended on 31 January of the same year.

Plot
Ng Ka-kit (Bowie Lam) is a promotions manager for an IT company and is sent by the company to take part in a training project in Beijing. Kit never imagined that this training involves learning Wushu. At the Wushu Academy, he meets his old nemesis, Vivian Yan (Sonija Kwok) who is a singer and also sacked office boy Lam Muk-sui (Patrick Tang). Vivian is learning Wushu because she wants to break into the American markets. These three Hong Kong people, who normally would not talk to each other find common ground and a common enemy in their Beijing coach Sun Zheng (Chen Zhihui). Kit fancies the assistant coach He Dan (Gong Beibi) but she likes someone else. Living together at the Wushu Academy makes Kit, Vivian and Sui understand that Zheng is strict because he wants to train their concentration and Wushu spirit. When they realize this, their hatred turns into respect and Kit and Zheng become great friends.

On his return to Hong Kong, Kit finds that he has lost all his power in the company and angrily resigns. On the other hand, Vivian's popularity has been dimmed by a newcomer. Sharing their problems, they go into business together and just as Kit is about to ask Vivian to be his girlfriend, her career picks up and she declines his love. At this time, Dan comes to Hong Kong to work as stunt double in order to fund her boyfriend's dream. Kit rekindles his feelings for Dan as Vivian looks on with envy but holds back her own feelings for the sake of her ego.

Cast

External links
 Official TVBI Website

TVB dramas
Hong Kong action television series
Hong Kong comedy television series
Martial arts television series
Hong Kong romance television series
2002 Hong Kong television series debuts
2002 Hong Kong television series endings
2004 Hong Kong television series debuts
2004 Hong Kong television series endings
2013 Hong Kong television series debuts
2013 Hong Kong television series endings
2000s romance television series